Gérard Blitz (28 February 1912 – 3 March 1990) was a Belgian entrepreneur and Yogi.

Born in Antwerp, he was the son of Maurice Blitz and nephew of Gérard Blitz, both members of the Belgian water polo national team who won Olympic medals.

He was apolitical during the 1930s, but joined the French Resistance in World War II. After the war, he founded Club Med.

On 27 April 1950, Gérard Blitz founded the Club Méditerranée association. In the same year, the first vacation resort for the members of the club was opened on Majorca island, in Spain.

Gérard Blitz was also a promoter of yoga practice. He was secretary and then president of the European Union of Yoga from 1974 to his death in 1990 in Paris.

Bibliography 

Gérard Blitz, Bruno Solt : La Vacance, Dervy, Paris, 1990, .

References
 Jews in Sports

1912 births
1990 deaths
Businesspeople from Antwerp
Belgian Jews
French Resistance members
20th-century Belgian businesspeople
People in tourism